Wadwick is a hamlet and civil parish situated in the North Wessex Downs Area of Outstanding Natural Beauty in the Basingstoke and Deane district of Hampshire, England. It is in the civil parish of St Mary Bourne. 
Its nearest town is Andover, which lies approximately 6.1 miles (10 km) south-west, although it lies 2 miles closer to Whitchurch.

Villages in Hampshire